The Kalar, known as the Levoy Chinoy in its upper section, is a river in Zabaykalsky Krai, southern East Siberia, Russia. The area through which the river flows is mountainous in most of its length with frequent rapids in the riverbed. The waters are rich in fish, including grayling, lenok, taimen and whitefish, among other species. In the International scale of river difficulty the Kalar is a Class III - IV destination for rafting and kayaking. 

The Kalar has lent its name to a number of other geographic features, including the Kalar Range, the local Kalar District, as well as Sredny Kalar (Middle Kalar) village by its right bank  from its mouth.

Course
The Kalar is a right tributary of the Vitim. Its sources are between the Udokan Range and the Kalar Range subranges of the Stanovoy Highlands. In its upper course it cuts eastwards across the Kalar Range in a wide arc as the Levoy Chinoy. The river flows at the foot of Skalisty Golets, the highest peak of the Kalar Range. Then it turns and flows roughly southwestwards as the Kalar. The Kalar range rises above the northern banks of the river and the Yankan Range above the southern, separating it from the course of the Kalakan to the south. Finally, at the border with Buryatia the Kalar meets the Vitim  from its mouth in the Lena. 

The river is frozen between mid October and mid May. About 20% of the basin area is covered by forests.

See also
List of rivers of Russia

References

External links

Rivers of Zabaykalsky Krai
Stanovoy Highlands